The men's discus throw at the 2014 European Athletics Championships took place at the Letzigrund on 12 and 13 August.

Medalists

Records

Schedule

Results

Qualification

Qualification: Qualification Performance 64.00 (Q) or at least 12 best performers advance to the final

Final

References

Qualification Results
Final Results

Discus Throw M
Discus throw at the European Athletics Championships